The 1960 South American Basketball Championship for Women was the 8th regional tournament for women in South America. It was held in Santiago, Chile and won by the local squad. Five teams competed.

Final rankings

Results

Each team played the other teams twice, for a total of eight games played by each team.

External links
FIBA Archive

1960
1960 in women's basketball
International women's basketball competitions hosted by Chile
1960 in Chilean sport
Sports competitions in Santiago
November 1960 sports events in South America
December 1960 sports events in South America
1960s in Santiago, Chile